The Master Genealogist (TMG) is genealogy software originally created  by Bob Velke for Microsoft DOS in 1993, with a version for Microsoft Windows released in 1996. Data entry was customized through the use of user-defined events, names, and relationship types. Official support for TMG ceased at the end of 2014. Informal support continues through a number of online user groups.

Features 
 Designed for both normal users and genealogy professionals
 Flexibly displays information
 Has elaborate database-oriented support for source and citation information
 Supports the inclusion of media files
 Supports DNA information
 Allows the user to record conflicting evidence
 Allows a "Surety" of a given piece of evidence to be recorded
 Supports elaborate chart-making
 Supports smart importing of genealogy files. Its GenBridge recognizes many common genealogy data format files from other programs and imports genealogical data directly into TMG.  This minimizes the loss of data when transferred from other software and avoids some of the problems caused by transferring files through the limited but universal GEDCOM format.

Source types
The default source types in the standard edition are based on Wholly Genes' interpretation of Elizabeth Shown Mills's Evidence! Citation & Analysis for the Family Historian. Source templates based upon Wholly Genes' interpretation of the source types in Richard S. Lackey's Cite Your Sources are also provided. The source templates in the UK edition are based on designs by Caroline Gurney for sources commonly encountered in the United Kingdom.

Platforms 
From version 2 onwards TMG was designed to run on the Windows platform but can be run on Macintosh and Linux machines using a Windows emulator.

Limitations
 TMG did not support Unicode, which limits data entry to the Western European (Latin) character set. 
 Before TMG version 8, reports generated on computers with 64-bit operating systems (only) were limited to "txt", HTML, and PDF output, although popular word processor reporting formats were supported on 32-bit platforms.  The print routine was rewritten for the current version (v 9.05) of the program eliminating this restriction.
 Some users have complained about the limitations in the program's multilingual support in narratives. This issue is focused on personal pronoun and other individual word replacement resulting in output that may have minor grammar errors.

TMG version history 
Please press show for more information on past versions.

Migration from TMG

GEDCOM

TMG has elaborate and detailed support for sources in a database format where a source can be referred to by any other record.  In the GEDCOM database specification, sources can be attached to any number of individuals or multiple families, by attaching to any number of facts for that individual or family.  Exporting a TMG database involves duplicating the sources into each place where a given source is used.  All of the information is exported, but the structure of each source is lost permanently.

An example is when there is a census or ship's record that lists many members of an extended family.  TMG allows each individual's entry to refer to a common source record, which can itself have an elaborate description. GEDCOM also allows every fact in that census or ship record to apply to a single source, it's simply a matter of tagging the facts with that source. This may vary with how TMG handles sources but that's perhaps the fault of TMG not adhering to the standard that was well established prior to the program being produced.

Non GEDCOM exports of TMG
The following options allow for some form of direct transfer of TMG files, possibly limited, apart from GEDCOM.

 tmg2gramps Converts TMG 6 datafiles to a GRAMPS v2.2.6 XML - by Anne Jessel.
 Forays Into Genealogy Data Base Modelling - Details how Leif Biberg Kristensen moved his data out of TMG into a program of his own creation .
 History Research Environment - This community project is creating a free and open source platform-independent application for the serious or professional historical researcher. It is designed to provide an onward path for genealogists who currently use the now-discontinued program The Master Genealogist (TMG).
 RootsMagic - RootsMagic can now directly import files from TMG 7.04, 8.08, or later.

File format
TMG's underlying database engine is Visual FoxPro v9 and does not support Unicode.

 File Structures for (TMG) for v9 - Last updated July, 2014
 TMG File Structure - Applicable to TMG v3.x, v4.x, v5.x, v6.x, v7.x

Companion products
Several software developers have created companion products specifically for TMG that enhance its functionality. These products include:

 Second Site, advanced web publishing and data review application for TMG - by John Cardinal
 PathWiz!, TMG exhibit file management product - by BeeSoft
 GedStar Pro, for Android smartphones display application - by GHCS Software.
 GenSmarts, research advisor that analyzes users' genealogical data and offers suggestions

TMG data output is compatible with a range of geographical mapping and genealogical reporting applications that support the GEDCOM format.

Significant freeware and shareware utility applications, as well as independently published user guides and manuals, also support TMG's installed user base.

References

External links
 Wholly Genes
 Lee Hoffman's TMG Tips
 Terry's TMG Tips
 Customizing TMG™ Using It My Way, On-Line Book by ©MJH
 Installers for Older TMG Versions, Alternate location for downloads by The ROOTS Users Group of Arlington, VA.

Reviews
 Version 6 Review
 Version 7 Review
 Version 7 Review

Windows-only genealogy software
1993 software